The Absence of War is a play by English playwright David Hare, the final installment of his trilogy about contemporary Britain. The play premiered in 1993 at the Royal National Theatre, London, England.

The play is based on his behind the scenes observations of the Labour Party leadership during their unsuccessful General Election campaign of 1992.

The central character, party leader George Jones, is so smothered and constricted by his cautious advisers that eventually none of the great talents that brought him to prominence are visible to the public.

References

Further reading

External links
 

1993 plays
Plays by David Hare
West End plays